Petrovka is a rural locality (a village) in Staromatinsky Selsoviet, Bakalinsky District, Bashkortostan, Russia. The population was 16 as of 2010.

Geography 
It is located 26 km from Bakaly.

References 

Rural localities in Bakalinsky District